Mission to Please is the 27th studio album by The Isley Brothers, released on May 14, 1996, on Island Records. It was a return to commercial glory for the group in the years following their platinum-certified album Between the Sheets (1983). Mission to Please also went platinum based on the strength of the charted singles "Let's Lay Together," a new duet with R. Kelly after the success of "Down Low (Nobody Has to Know)" (1995); the Babyface-composed ballad "Tears"; "Floatin' on Your Love," featuring Angela Winbush (Ronald Isley and she were married from 1993 to 2002); and the mid-'90s quiet-storm radio staple "Mission to Please You." Some of the album's success was due to Ronald Isley cultivating a new image as the character of "Mr. Biggs" in a series of R. Kelly videos, starting with "Down Low," helping to introduce the music of the Isley Brothers to a new generation of R&B fans. Mission to Please is the last Isley Brothers album to feature youngest brother Marvin Isley, who left the group in 1997 because of complications from diabetes; he died on June 6, 2010. Mission to Please also helped relaunch the Isley Brothers' label, T-Neck Records.

Track listing
"Floatin' On Your Love" (Featuring Angela Winbush) (Reggie Griffin, Ronald Isley, Angela Winbush)  – 4:09
"Whenever You're Ready" (Griffin, Isley, Winbush) – 4:50
"Let's Lay Together" (R. Kelly) – 4:32
"Tears" (Babyface) – 4:45
"Can I Have a Kiss (For Old Time's Sake)?" (Kelly, Winbush) – 4:46
"Mission to Please You" (Isley, Kelly, Winbush) – 4:27
"Holding Back the Years" (Mick Hucknall, Neil Moss) – 5:30
"Make Your Body Sing" (Griffin, Isley, Winbush) – 4:06
"Let's Get Intimate" (Ernie Isley, R. Isley, Winbush) – 5:57
"Slow Is the Way" (Emanuel Officer, Keith Sweat) – 4:55

Charts

Weekly charts

Year-end charts

Certifications

References

1996 albums
The Isley Brothers albums
Albums produced by Angela Winbush
Albums produced by R. Kelly
Albums produced by Ronald Isley